In mathematical analysis, the Brezis–Gallouët inequality, named after Haïm Brezis and Thierry Gallouët, is an inequality valid in 2 spatial dimensions.   It shows that a function of two variables which is sufficiently smooth is (essentially) bounded, and provides an explicit bound, which depends only logarithmically on the second derivatives.  It is useful in the study of partial differential equations.

Let  be the exterior or the interior of a bounded domain with regular boundary, or  itself.  Then the Brezis–Gallouët inequality states that there exists a real  only depending on  such that, for all   which is not  a.e. equal to 0,

Noticing that, for any  , there holds

one deduces from the Brezis-Gallouet inequality that there exists  only depending on  such that, for all   which is not  a.e. equal to 0,

The previous inequality is close to the way that the Brezis-Gallouet inequality is cited in.

See also
 Ladyzhenskaya inequality
 Agmon's inequality

References

Theorems in analysis
Inequalities